Arthur Joseph "Tillie" Shafer (March 22, 1889 – January 10, 1962) was a Major League Baseball infielder with the New York Giants from 1909 to 1913.

Career
While attending Santa Clara University, Shafer was one of the most accomplished college athletes on the west coast, winning numerous track and field medals, in addition for playing baseball for the then-Missionites of Santa Clara. He was once timed at 3.2 seconds running from the batter's box to first base.

However, his time in Major League Baseball wasn't very happy for him. A young, shy man from a wealthy family, Shafer was hassled from the moment he first entered the Giants' clubhouse as a rookie. Outfielder Cy Seymour gave him the feminine nickname "Tillie", which stuck. Throughout his tenure in New York, Shafer was branded as a "momma's boy" and razzed by his teammates.

After two seasons of sitting on the bench, Shafer took 1911 off to go home and also to play baseball in Japan. He returned the following season, and in 1913, he was a regular in the Giants' starting line-up for the first time. He got to play in the 1912 and 1913 World Series.

In 283 games over four seasons, Shafer posted a .273 batting average (212-for-776) with 138 runs, 5 home runs, 84 RBIs, 60 stolen bases and 105 bases on balls.

On December 16, 1913, Shafer announced his retirement. He summed up his time with the Giants with: "I have satisfied every ambition in a baseball way. Now I want to forget I was ever in it. It is an episode in my life that I am trying hard to forget."

References

External links

SABR Biography

1889 births
1962 deaths
Major League Baseball infielders
New York Giants (NL) players
Notre Dame Fighting Irish baseball players
Baseball players from Los Angeles